USS Tempest (PC-2) is the second of the  of United States Navy coastal patrol ships, named for various weather phenomena. She was transferred to the US Coast Guard as USCGC Tempest (WPC-2), on 1 October 2004, and placed in 'Commission Special' status until December 2005, when she was formally commissioned as a Coast Guard cutter. She was returned to the US Navy on 22 August 2008.

Construction
Tempest, the third US vessel to carry the name, was laid down on 30 September 1991, at Lockport, Louisiana, by Bollinger Machine Shop and Shipyard; launched on 4 April 1992; sponsored by Sara Livingston, wife of US Marine Corps Major General James E. Livingston, and commissioned on 21 August 1993, at Naval Amphibious Base Little Creek, Virginia.

Service history
Following the Haitian Army's overthrow of President Jean-Bertrand Aristide in September 1991, a succession of governments led to sectarian violence, and in May 1994, the military installed Supreme Court Justice Emile Jonassaint as Haiti's provisional president. The United Nations (UN) authorized force to restore order and the US initiated Operations Support Democracy and Uphold/Restore Democracy: Uphold Democracy for a peaceful entry into Haiti, and Restore Democracy in the event of resistance.

On 6 July, amphibious assault ship  sailed from Norfolk, Virginia, in response to the crisis. Another amphibious assault ship,  relieved Inchon in Haitian waters on 17 August. About 1,800 soldiers of the US Army's XVIII Airborne Corps embarked on board Dwight D. Eisenhower. The US transferred peacekeeping functions to international forces on 31 March 1995.

Operational control of the ships, normally assigned to Special Operations Command through Commander, Naval Special Warfare Command, shifted to the Pacific Fleet.

The Coast Guard acquired five of the Navy's Cyclone-class patrol ship beginning on 1 October 2004. The Coast Guard initiated the action because of its aging fleet, increased operational hours following the terrorist attack on 9/11, delays in delivery of the converted 123-foot patrol boats, and the continued deployment of 110-foot cutters to the Persian Gulf, all of which created a gap in patrol boat availability. The transfer immediately lessened shortfalls in patrol boat hours. The Navy and Coast Guard signed an agreement in August 2004, that allowed five ships to be under the operational command of the Coast Guard. Two of the five ships were scheduled to be returned to the Navy in 2008; the remainder in 2011.

The Memorandum of Understanding directed the Navy to retain ownership as well as the responsibility for all life cycle management/maintenance, depot management, and casualty corrective service through 2008. The Coast Guard assumed the "responsibility for crew assignment, cutter funding, retrofitting, operation and management." Tempest was decommissioned and transferred to the Coast Guard, which reclassified her as WPC-2, on September 30, 2004. The Coast Guard operated her until 22 August 2008, when she was returned to the Navy.

In 2013, Tempest shifted homeport to Naval Support Activity Bahrain. While deployed to the Persian Gulf, on 24 August 2016,  fired three warning shots from a  cal. machine gun at an Iranian Revolutionary Guard Navy fast attack craft that approached within  of Tempest. The fast attack craft had ignored radio calls to veer off as well as warning flares.

On 7 March 2022, the ship was decommissioned during a ceremony at Naval Support Activity Bahrain.

References

Bibliography

External links

FAS

 

Cyclone-class patrol ships
Ships of the United States Coast Guard
Ships built in Lockport, Louisiana
1992 ships